Mabana is a town located in the Province of Annobón in Equatorial Guinea.

Notes

Populated places in Annobón